Etienne Amara Camara (born 30 March 2003) is a French professional footballer who plays for Huddersfield Town as a midfielder.

Career
Born in Noisy-le-Grand, France, Camara started his football career at US Torcy and Angers SCO, before moving to Huddersfield Town in October 2020.

Camara made his senior debut for Huddersfield Town on 9 January 2021, when he made a substitute appearance in their 3–2 FA Cup defeat against Plymouth Argyle.

On 13 August 2022, Camara made his league debut as an 83rd minute substitute, replacing Sorba Thomas, in a 3-1 win against Stoke City at the John Smith’s Stadium.

Career statistics

References

2003 births
Living people
People from Noisy-le-Grand
French footballers
French sportspeople of Malian descent
Angers SCO players
US Torcy players
Huddersfield Town A.F.C. players
Association football midfielders
French expatriate footballers
French expatriates in England
Expatriate footballers in England